Kanyshbek is a village in central Tajikistan. It is part of the jamoat Nushor in Tojikobod District, one of the Districts of Republican Subordination. It lies on the river Surkhob.

References

Populated places in Districts of Republican Subordination